Mount Morfee, is a 1,775 metre (5,823 feet) peak in the Misinchinka Ranges, a subdivision range of the Hart Ranges, within the Northern Rocky Mountains. The mountain is known locally as Morfee Mountain and features prominently over the town Mackenzie, BC.

It was named for Flight Lieutenant Alan Morfee of the Royal Canadian Air Force, who flew the earliest air photography of the region in the early 1930s. The nearby Morfee Lake and Morfee Creek are also named after Flight Lieutenant Morfee, as well as an island near Tofino, BC.

Given its easy accessibility via Highway 39, the mountain is a popular snowmobile destination in the winter.  A gravel road to the summit also provides easily accessible biking and hiking opportunities during the summer season.

References 

Canadian Rockies
One-thousanders of British Columbia
Northern Interior of British Columbia
Cariboo Land District